The 16th Ariel Awards ceremony, organized by the Mexican Academy of Film Arts and Sciences (AMACC) took place on March 22, 1974, in Mexico City. During the ceremony, AMACC presented the Ariel Award in 14 categories honoring films released in 1973. El Principio was the most nominated film, and also the most awarded with eight wins including a Special Award for child actor Rogelio Flores. El Principio won for Best Picture and Best Director. Two-time Ariel winner film, Calzonzin Inspector, directed by Alfonso Arau, was selected to represent Mexico at the 47th Academy Awards, but was not nominated.

Winners and nominees
Winners are listed first and highlighted with boldface.

Multiple nominations and awards

The following six films received multiple nominations:

Films that received multiple awards:

References

Ariel Awards ceremonies
1974 film awards
1974 in Mexico